Uthamapalayam is a former state assembly constituency in Theni district in Tamil Nadu, India.

Madras State

Election results

1962

1957

1952

References

External links
 

Theni district
Former assembly constituencies of Tamil Nadu